The 2006 Sundance Film Festival was held in Utah from January 19, to January 29, 2006. It was held in Park City, with screenings in Salt Lake City; Ogden; and the Sundance Resort. It was the 22nd iteration of the Sundance Film Festival, and the celebration of the 25th anniversary of the Sundance Institute. The opening night film was Friends with Money; the closing night film was Alpha Dog.

Award winners
The official announcement of the winners can be found here.
Grand Jury Prize: Documentary - God Grew Tired of Us
Grand Jury Prize: Dramatic - Quinceañera
World Cinema Jury Prize: Documentary - In The Pit
World Cinema Jury Prize: Dramatic - 13 Tzameti
Audience Award: Documentary - God Grew Tired of Us
Audience Award: Dramatic - Quinceañera
World Cinema Audience Award: Documentary - De Nadie
World Cinema Audience Award: Dramatic - No. 2
Documentary Directing Award - James Longley director of Iraq in Fragments
Dramatic Directing Award - Dito Montiel for A Guide to Recognizing Your Saints
Excellence in Cinematography Award: Documentary - James Longley for Iraq in Fragments
Excellence in Cinematography Award: Dramatic - Tom Richmond for Right at Your Door
Documentary Film Editing - Iraq in Fragments
Waldo Salt Screenwriting Award - Hilary Brougher for Stephanie Daley
Special Jury Prize - American Blackout
Special Jury Prize - A Guide to Recognizing Your Saints (for Best Ensemble Performance)
Special Jury Prize - In Between Days (for Independent Vision)
Special Jury Prize - Into Great Silence
Special Jury Prize - Dear Pyongyang
Special Jury Prize - Eve & the Fire Horse
Jury Prize in Short Filmmaking - Bugcrush
Jury Prize in Short Filmmaking - The Wrath of Cobble Hill
Jury Prize in International Short Filmmaking - The Natural Route
Honorable Mention in Short Filmmaking - Before Dawn
Honorable Mention in Short Filmmaking - Preacher With an Unknown God
Honorable Mention in Short Filmmaking - Undressing My Mother
2006 Alfred P. Sloan Prize - The House of Sand

Juries
The juries at the Sundance Film Festival are responsible for determining the Jury Prize winners in each category and to award Special Jury Prizes as they see fit.

Jury, Independent Film Competition: Documentary
Joe Bini
Zana Briski
Andrew Jarecki
Alexander Payne
Heather Rae

Jury, Independent Film Competition: Dramatic
Miguel Arteta
Terrence Howard
Alan Rudolph
Nancy Schreiber
Audrey Wells

Jury, World Cinema Competition: Documentary
Kate Amend
Jean-Xavier de Lestrade
Rachel Perkins

Jury, World Cinema Competition: Dramatic
Irene Bignardi
Lu Chuan
Thomas Vinterberg

Jury, Shorts Competition
Georgia Lee
Sydney Neter
John Vanco

Alfred P. Sloan Feature Film Prize Jury
John Underkoffler
Greg Harrison
Lynn Hershman Leeson
Antonio Demasio

Film Selections

Independent Film Competition: Documentary
American Blackout
Crossing Arizona
God Grew Tired of Us
The Ground Truth: After the Killing Ends
Iraq in Fragments
A Lion in the House
small town gay bar
So Much So Fast
Thin
'Tis Autumn-The Search for Jackie Paris
The Trials of Darryl Hunt
TV Junkie
An Unreasonable Man
Wide Awake
Wordplay
The World According to Sesame Street

Independent Film Competition: Dramatic
Come Early Morning
Flannel Pajamas
Forgiven
A Guide to Recognizing Your Saints
Half Nelson
The Hawk Is Dying
In Between Days
Puccini for Beginners
Quinceañera
Right at Your Door
Sherrybaby
Somebodies
Stay
Steel City
Stephanie Daley
Wristcutters: A Love Story

World Cinema Competition: Documentary
5 Days
angry monk-reflections on tibet
Black Gold
By the Ways, A Journey with William Eggleston
Dear Pyongyang
DeNADIE
The Giant Buddhas
Glastonbury
I for India
In the Pit
Into Great Silence
KZ
The Short Life of José Antonio Gutierrez
Songbirds
Unfolding Florence: The Many Lives of Florence Broadhurst
Viva Zapatero!

World Cinema Competition: Dramatic
13 Tzameti
Allegro
The Aura
The Blossoming of Maximo Oliveros
Eve & the Fire Horse
The House of Sand
It's Only Talk
Kiss Me Not on the Eyes
Little Red Flowers
Madeinusa
No. 2
One Last Dance
The Peter Pan Formula
Princesas
Sólo Dios Sabe
Son of Man

Premieres
Alpha Dog
Art School Confidential
Cargo
The Darwin Awards
Don't Come Knocking
Friends with Money
The Illusionist
Kinky Boots
Little Miss Sunshine
A Little Trip to Heaven
Lucky Number Slevin
Neil Young: Heart of Gold
The Night Listener
The Science of Sleep
The Secret Life of Words
Thank You for Smoking
This Film Is Not Yet Rated

Spectrum
Adam's Apples
All Aboard! Rosie's Family Cruise
Battle in Heaven
Beyond Beats and Rhymes: A Hip-Hop Head Weighs in on Manhood in Hip-Hop Culture
Clear Cut: The Story of Philomath, Oregon
Dreamland
Everyone Stares: The Police Inside Out
Factotum
Forgiving the Franklins
An Inconvenient Truth
Jewboy
Journey from the Fall
Leonard Cohen: I'm Your Man
Man Push Cart
Off the Black
Open Window
The Proposition
Punching at the Sun
Special
La Tragedia de Macario
What Remains
Who Killed the Electric Car
Who Needs Sleep?
Wrestling with Angels: Playwright Tony Kushner

Park City at Midnight
American Hardcore
Awesome; I Fuckin' Shot That!
The Descent
Destricted
The Foot Fist Way
Moonshine
Salvage
Subject Two

Frontier
Cinnamon
a Darkness Swallowed
Old Joy
Pine Flat
Wild Tigers I Have Known

From The Collection
Mala Noche
Paris, Texas

Festival Theaters
 Ogden
 Peery's Egyptian Theatre - 800 seats
 Park City
 Eccles Theatre - 1,270 seats
 Egyptian Theatre - 266 seats
 Holiday Village Cinemas II - 156 seats
 Holiday Village Cinemas III - 156 seats
 Holiday Village Cinemas IIV - 164 seats
 Library Center Theatre - 448 seats
 Prospector Square Theatre - 352 seats
 Racquet Club Theatre - 602 seats
 Yarrow Hotel Theatre - 250 seats
 Salt Lake City
 Broadway Centre Cinemas IV  - 211 seats
 Broadway Centre Cinemas V - 238 seats
 Broadway Centre Cinemas VI - 274 seats
 Rose Wagner Performing Arts Center - 477 seats
 Tower Theatre - 342 seats
 Sundance Resort
 Sundance Institute Screening Room - 164 seats

References

2006
2006 in Utah
2006 film festivals
2006 in American cinema
2006 festivals in the United States
January 2006 events in the United States